BB11 can refer to:

BB11, a postcode district in the BB postcode area
Big Brother 11, a television programme in various versions